Mahant Darshan is a town and union council of Depalpur Tehsil in the Okara District of Punjab Province, Pakistan. The town is located at 30°13'60N 73°16'60E and has an altitude of 152 metres.

References

Union councils of Okara District